Anne-Li Ingvarsdotter Norberg (5 October 1953 – 17 August 2018) was a Swedish actress. Norberg studied acting at Svenska Artist- och musikskolan and later as well at Kulturama.  She graduated from stage school in Malmö in 1978 from the same class as actor Rolf Lassgård. During the 1970s and 1980s, she was in a relationship with actor Peter Haber and the couple had a child together actress Nina Haber. 

Norberg died on 17 August 2018 from cancer.

Selected filmography

1988: Venus 90 - Receptionist vid Perfecturum
1989: S/Y Joy - Seglarflicka
1989: Förhöret (TV Movie) - Journalist
1990: Black Jack - Policewoman
1990: Fiendens fiende (TV Mini-Series) - Bredbergs hustru
1991: Goltuppen (TV Mini-Series) - Jansson
1991: Harry Lund lägger näsan i blöt! - Eva
1993: Sunes sommar - resebyråkvinnan
1994: Polismördaren - Sigbrit Mård
1995: Tre Kronor (TV Series) - Portiern
1995: Tribunal (TV Movie) - Rådgivare
1996: Zonen (TV Mini-Series) - Major Drakenberg
1997: Emma åklagare (TV Series) - Eva Laurén
1997: Snoken (TV Series) - Ursula Sandler
1997: Skärgårdsdoktorn (TV Series) - Ann-Catherine Franzén
1998: Rederiet (TV Series) - Läkare 8
2000: Det grovmaskiga nätet (TV Mini-Series) - Sköterska
2001: En sång för Martin
2001: Känd från TV - Anchorwoman
2002: Beck (TV Series) - Eva Örnberg
2001: Jordgubbar med riktig mjölk - Kajsa
2002: Bella - bland kryddor och kriminella (TV Series) - Liv
2003: Paragraf 9 (TV Series) - Anna-Karin Norberg
2005: Kommissionen (TV Series) - Mirjam Nord
2005: Örnen (TV Series)
2006: Min frus förste älskare - Receptionist
2009: Oskyldigt dömd (TV Series)
2009-2010: Guds tre flickor (TV Series) - Karin
2010: Våra vänners liv (TV Series) - Davids mamma
2010: Den fördömde (TV Series)
2011: Maria Wern (TV Series) - Sjuksköterska
2011: The Girl with the Dragon Tattoo - Lindgren
2011: Juni - Oskars mamma
2012: Arne Dahl (TV Mini-Series) - Blomsterhandlare
2012: Morden i Sandhamn (TV Series) - Eva
2013: Bäst före - Ingela
2013-2014: Äkta människor (TV Series) - Justitierådet / Justitieråd
2014: Tjockare än vatten (TV Series) - Görel Hansson (försäkringsdam)
2015: Solsidan (TV Series) - Anita Wechselmann (final appearance)

References

External links 
  

1953 births
2018 deaths
Swedish film actresses
20th-century Swedish actresses
21st-century Swedish actresses
Swedish television actresses
People from Sollentuna Municipality
Deaths from cancer in Sweden